Kuum-Ni is an airport near Kuŭm-ni (Kuŭp-ri), in Tongchon, Kangwon-do province, North Korea.

Facilities 
The airfield has a single concrete runway 06/24 measuring 8150 x 130 feet (2484 x 40 m).  It has a full-length parallel taxiway, and several taxiways extending southwest to dispersed aircraft aprons and shelters carved out of a nearby hill.

References 

Airports in North Korea
Kangwon Province (North Korea)